HMS Crocodile was a 22-gun sixth-rate post-ship launched in South Shields in 1806. She was broken up at Portsmouth in October 1816.

Career
In July 1806 Captain John Astley Bennet commissioned Crocodile, but was replaced within the month by Captain George Edmund Byron Bettesworth.

In March 1807 Crocodile detained the American ship General Clarke, from Philadelphia, and sent her into Plymouth.

On 18 April, Crocodile sailed from Portsmouth as escort to a convoy bound for Quebec.
 
While with Crocodile, Bettesworth was involved in an unsuccessful claim for salvage rights to the American vessel Walker. A French privateer had captured Walker, but her crew had subsequently recaptured their ship when Crocodile came on the scene. Crocodile then escorted Walker to Halifax. For this service, Bettesworth claimed salvage rights. The court did not agree.

On 29 August 1807 Crocodile captured De Twende Brodre, while the privateer Lion was in sight.

Around this time Crocodile detained the Danish packet ship Foedres Mende, from Batavia and Bengal, and sent her into The Downs. The Gunboat War had commenced as the Royal Navy had sailed to attack Copenhagen.

Captain the Hon. George Cadogan succeeded Bettesworth on 6 October 1807. His First Lieutenant was Thomas Barker Devon.

Cadogan and Crocodile sailed to the Cape of Good Hope in December 1807 as escort to the storeship  and the transport Sally. They arrived in March after a voyage of 12 weeks. They brought recruits for the 29th, 72nd, and 93rd Regiments of Foot.

In August Crocodile carried Arthur Wellesley to Portugal to lead the British intervention in the Peninsular War. They escorted 75 transports, carrying 30,000 troops, from Cork to Mondego Bay.

In November Cadogan and Crocodile captured sundry Danish vessels. This led, in December 1809, to her receiving a distribution of £4000 in prize money; Cadogan would have received at least a quarter of that.

In March 1809 Crocodile captured three Danish vessels: Haabet, Manual, and Alexto, all carrying deals (a type of cheap lumber, usually of pine). The British gathered the vessels, and some more Danish vessels that other British vessels had captured, in Gothenburg. The captured vessels left Gothenburg on 23 March and by early April most had arrived at British ports. On 5 April Argus, of Norway, and also a prize to Crocodile, arrived in Yarmouth.

In mid-April 1809 Cadogan and Devons underwent a court-martial at Portsmouth. A Richard Cumberland had written to the Lords of the Admiralty that they had acted in a "cruel, tyrannical, and oppressive manner" towards his grandson, W.R. Badcock, a midshipman on Crocodile, and that this treatment had hastened Badcock's death. The court martial acquitted Cadogan and Devons, pointing out that the charges were not proven, that many of Cumberland's observations were unfounded, and that Badcock's death could not even remotely be tied to the punishment he had received on Crocodile.

Captain Edward H. Columbine replaced him on Crocodile. On 13 January 1810 Columbine sailed Crocodile for Africa.

During her time with the West Africa Squadron, Crocodile or her ship's tenders detained 11 vessels, though the Vice admiralty court in Freetown restored several to their owners.

On 22 May Crocodile took  for breach of the Act for the abolition of the slave trade. Although Donna Marianna was ostensibly a Portuguese vessel, a British court on appeal upheld the seizure on the grounds that she was actually a British vessel and her Portuguese papers were a fraud.

Thomas Ludlam, former Governor of Sierra Leone died on board HMS Crocodile on 25 July 1810.

On 19 June Columbine died during the night and in the morning the crew buried him at sea.

Captain John Richard Lumley succeeded Columbine in 1811, and was himself replaced by Captain William Elliot in June 1812. Elliot and Crocodile served on the Channel Islands station. Still, Elliot sailed her for Portugal on 9 November.

On 24 April 1813 Santos Marter, De Souza, master, arrived at Gibraltar. She had been sailing from Charleston to Cádiz when Crocodile captured her. Two weeks later, on 9 May, Roba & Betsey, Baldry, master, arrived at Gibraltar. She had been sailing from Charleston to Cadiz when Crocodile captured her.

Fate
Crocodile was paid off in June 1815. She then was broken up in October 1816 at Portsmouth.

Notes, citations and references
Notes

Citations

References
 Boyden, Peter B. (2001) The British Army in Cape Colony: soldiers' letters and diaries, 1806-58. (Society for Army Historical Research - Cape of Good Hope, South Africa).
 
 Hersee, William (1829) The Spirit of the General Letters and Orders Issued by the ... Board of Excise, for the Guidance of Officers ... from 1700 to 1827 Inclusive. ... With ... Notes
 Stewart, James, Nova Scotia. Vice-Admiralty Court (1814) Reports of cases, argued and determined in the court of vice-admiralty: at Halifax, in Nova-Scotia, from the commencement of the war, in 1803, to the end of the year 1813, in the time of Alexander Croke. (London : J. Butterworth).
 O'Byrne, William R. (1849) A naval biographical dictionary: comprising the life and services of every living officer in Her Majesty's navy, from the rank of admiral of the fleet to that of lieutenant, inclusive. (London: J. Murray), vol. 1.
 
  

Post ships of the Royal Navy
1806 ships
Ships built by Temple shipbuilders
Ships of the West Africa Squadron
African slave trade
Liberian-American history